The printf format string is  a control parameter used by a class of functions in the input/output libraries of C and many other programming languages. The string is written in a simple template language: characters are usually copied literally into the function's output, but format specifiers, which start with a  character, indicate the location and method to translate a piece of data (such as a number) to characters.

"printf" is the name of one of the main C output functions, and stands for "print formatted". printf format strings are complementary to scanf format strings, which provide formatted input (lexing aka. parsing). In both cases these provide simple functionality and fixed format compared to more sophisticated and flexible template engines or lexers/parsers, but are sufficient for many purposes.

Many languages other than C copy the printf format string syntax closely or exactly in their own I/O functions.

Mismatches between the format specifiers and type of the data can cause crashes and other vulnerabilities. The format string itself is very often a string literal, which allows static analysis of the function call. However, it can also be the value of a variable, which allows for dynamic formatting but also a security vulnerability known as an uncontrolled format string exploit.

History
Early programming languages such as Fortran used special statements with completely different syntax from other calculations to build formatting descriptions. In this example, the format is specified on line 601, and the WRITE command refers to it by line number:
      WRITE OUTPUT TAPE 6, 601, IA, IB, IC, AREA
 601  FORMAT (4H A= ,I5,5H  B= ,I5,5H  C= ,I5,
     &        8H  AREA= ,F10.2, 13H SQUARE UNITS)

ALGOL 68 had more function-like API, but still used special syntax (the  delimiters surround special formatting syntax):
printf(($"Color "g", number1 "6d,", number2 "4zd,", hex "16r2d,", float "-d.2d,", unsigned value"-3d"."l$,
         "red", 123456, 89, BIN 255, 3.14, 250));

But using the normal function calls and data types simplifies the language and compiler, and allows the implementation of the input/output to be written in the same language. These advantages outweigh the disadvantages (such as a complete lack of type safety in many instances) and in most newer languages I/O is not part of the syntax.

C's  has its origins in BCPL's  function (1966).
WRITEF("%I2-QUEENS PROBLEM HAS %I5 SOLUTIONS*N", NUMQUEENS, COUNT)

Probably the first copying of the syntax outside the C language was the Unix  shell command, which first appeared in Version 4, as part of the port to C.

Format placeholder specification
Formatting takes place via placeholders within the format string. For example, if a program wanted to print out a person's age, it could present the output by prefixing it with "Your age is ", and using the signed decimal specifier character  to denote that we want the integer for the age to be shown immediately after that message, we may use the format string:
printf("Your age is %d", age);

Syntax
The syntax for a format placeholder is

Parameter field
This is a POSIX extension and not in C99. The Parameter field can be omitted or can be:

This feature mainly sees its use in localization, where the order of occurrence of parameters vary due to the language-dependent convention.

On the non-POSIX Microsoft Windows, support for this feature is placed in a separate printf_p function.

Flags field
The Flags field can be zero or more (in any order) of:

Width field
The Width field specifies a minimum number of characters to output and is typically used to pad fixed-width fields in tabulated output, where the fields would otherwise be smaller, although it does not cause truncation of oversized fields.

The width field may be omitted, or a numeric integer value, or a dynamic value when passed as another argument when indicated by an asterisk . For example,  will result in    10 being printed, with a total width of 5 characters.

Though not part of the width field, a leading zero is interpreted as the zero-padding flag mentioned above, and a negative value is treated as the positive value in conjunction with the left-alignment  flag also mentioned above.

Precision field
The Precision field usually specifies a maximum limit on the output, depending on the particular formatting type. For floating-point numeric types, it specifies the number of digits to the right of the decimal point that the output should be rounded. For the string type, it limits the number of characters that should be output, after which the string is truncated.

The precision field may be omitted, or a numeric integer value, or a dynamic value when passed as another argument when indicated by an asterisk . For example,  will result in  being printed.

Length field
The Length field can be omitted or be any of:

Additionally, several platform-specific length options came to exist prior to widespread use of the ISO C99 extensions:

ISO C99 includes the inttypes.h header file that includes a number of macros for use in platform-independent  coding.  These must be outside double-quotes, e.g. 

Example macros include:

Type field
The Type field can be any of:

Custom format placeholders
There are a few implementations of -like functions that allow extensions to the escape-character-based mini-language, thus allowing the programmer to have a specific formatting function for non-builtin types.  One of the most well-known is the (now deprecated) glibc's .  However, it is rarely used due to the fact that it conflicts with static format string checking.  Another is Vstr custom formatters, which allows adding multi-character format names.

Some applications (like the Apache HTTP Server) include their own -like function, and embed extensions into it. However these all tend to have the same problems that  has.

The Linux kernel printk function supports a number of ways to display kernel structures using the generic  specification, by appending additional format characters. For example,  prints an IPv4 address in dotted-decimal form.  This allows static format string checking (of the  portion) at the expense of full compatibility with normal printf.

Most languages that have a -like function work around the lack of this feature by just using the  format and converting the object to a string representation.

Vulnerabilities

Invalid conversion specifications
If there are too few function arguments provided to supply values for all the conversion specifications in the template string, or if the arguments are not of the correct types, the results are undefined, may crash. Implementations are inconsistent about whether syntax errors in the string consume an argument and what type of argument they consume. Excess arguments are ignored. In a number of cases, the undefined behavior has led to "Format string attack" security vulnerabilities. In most C or C++ calling conventions arguments may be passed on the stack, which means in the case of too few arguments printf will read past the end of the current stackframe, thus allowing the attacker to read the stack.

Some compilers, like the GNU Compiler Collection, will statically check the format strings of printf-like functions and warn about problems (when using the flags  or ). GCC will also warn about user-defined printf-style functions if the non-standard "format"  is applied to the function.

Field width versus explicit delimiters in tabular output
Using only field widths to provide for tabulation, as with a format like  for three integers in three 8-character columns, will not guarantee that field separation will be retained if large numbers occur in the data:

 1234567 1234567 1234567 
 123     123     123     
 123     12345678123     

Loss of field separation can easily lead to corrupt output. In systems which encourage the use of programs as building blocks in scripts, such corrupt data can often be forwarded into and corrupt further processing, regardless of whether the original programmer expected the output would only be read by human eyes. Such problems can be eliminated by including explicit delimiters, even spaces, in all tabular output formats.  Simply changing the dangerous example from before to  addresses this, formatting identically until numbers become larger, but then explicitly preventing them from becoming merged on output due to the explicitly included spaces:

 1234567 1234567 1234567 
 123     123     123     
 123     12345678 123     

Similar strategies apply to string data.

Memory write
Although an outputting function on the surface,  allows writing to a memory location specified by an argument via . This functionality is occasionally used as a part of more elaborate format-string attacks.

The  functionality also makes  accidentally Turing-complete even with a well-formed set of arguments. A game of tic-tac-toe written in the format string is a winner of the 27th IOCCC.

Programming languages with printf
Not included in this list are languages that use format strings that deviate from the style in this article (such as AMPL and Elixir), languages that inherit their implementation from the JVM or other environment (such as Clojure and Scala), and languages that do not have a standard native printf implementation but have external libraries which emulate printf behavior (such as JavaScript).

awk
C
C++ (also provides overloaded shift operators and manipulators as an alternative for formatted output – see iostream and iomanip)
Objective-C
D
F#
G (LabVIEW)
GNU MathProg
GNU Octave
Go
Haskell
J
Java (since version 1.5) and JVM languages
Julia (via its Printf standard library; Formatting.jl library adds Python-style general formatting and "c-style part of this package aims to get around the limitation that @sprintf has to take a literal string argument.")
Lua (string.format)
Maple
MATLAB
Max (via the sprintf object)
Mythryl
OCaml (via the Printf module)
PARI/GP
Perl
PHP
Python (via  operator)
R
Red/System
Ruby
Tcl (via format command)
Transact-SQL (via xp_sprintf)
Vala (via  and )
The  utility command, sometimes built in to the shell, such as with some implementations of the KornShell (ksh), Bourne again shell (bash), or Z shell (zsh). These commands usually interpret C escapes in the format string.

See also
 Format (Common Lisp)
 C standard library
 Format string attack
 iostream
 ML (programming language)
 printf debugging
  (Unix)
 printk (print kernel messages)
 scanf
 string interpolation

References

External links
C++ reference for 
gcc printf format specifications quick reference

The  specification in Java 1.5
GNU Bash  builtin

Articles with example C code
C standard library
Unix software